PSB-SB-1202 is a coumarin derivative which is an agonist at the cannabinoid receptors CB1 and CB2, with a CB1 Ki of 32nM and a CB2 Ki of 49nM. It is also a weak antagonist at the related receptor GPR55, with an IC50 of 6350nM, but has no significant affinity for GPR18.

See also 
 PSB-SB-487

References 

Cannabinoids
Coumarins